Punta Alta de Comalesbienes, also known as Punta Alta, is a mountain of Catalonia, Spain. Punta Alta has an elevation of 3.014 metres above sea level.

It is located close to the 2993 m high Pic de Comalesbienes, on the eastern side of the Estany de Cavallers glacial lake, near the Besiberri Massif, in the Vall de Boí, Pyrenees.

See also
List of Pyrenean three-thousanders
Mountains of Catalonia

References

External links
 Ressenya des Cavallers

Mountains of Catalonia
Mountains of the Pyrenees